Bertha Carolina Mathilda Tammelin, née Bock (Stockholm, 21 March 1836 – 2 January 1915) was a Swedish actress, operatic mezzo-soprano, pianist, composer and drama teacher.

Life
Bertha Tammelin was born to Karolina Bock and a musician of Kungliga Hovkapellet, C. Bock. She was educated at the Royal Dramatic Training Academy 1853–55 and hired at the Royal Swedish Opera and at the Royal Dramatic Theatre as a premier actress in 1856. She performed both operatic parts and dramatic parts. As an actress, her most noted part was Ingrid in Bröllopet på Ulvåsa by Frans Hedberg, and as a singer, Puck in Oberon.

She was also a musician. She held piano concerts at the age of fourteen. She was also active as a composer. Several of her works was a part of the collection Det sjungande Europa ('The Singing Europe'). From 1879, she was a music teacher at the Royal Swedish Academy of Music, and in 1889, she was made teacher of drama at the Royal Dramatic Training Academy. She also had private students. Among her famous students were Ellen Hartman and Ebba Lindkvist.

Bertha Tammelin experienced weak eyesight her entire life, and eventually, it worsened: she retired because of this condition, making her final appearance on stage on 7 March 1884.

She married accountant Filip Tammelin in 1873. Bertha Tammelin was given the Litteris et Artibus in 1885.

References 

 Österberg, Carin et al., Svenska kvinnor: föregångare, nyskapare. Lund: Signum 1990.
 Ahnfelt, Arvid:Europas konstnärer - Bertha Tammelin

1836 births
1915 deaths
19th-century classical composers
19th-century Swedish actresses
19th-century Swedish educators
19th-century Swedish women opera singers
20th-century Swedish educators
Blind classical musicians
Women classical composers
Litteris et Artibus recipients
Swedish classical composers
Swedish classical pianists
Swedish operatic mezzo-sopranos
Swedish stage actresses
Women classical pianists
19th-century women composers
19th-century women pianists